The 2016–17 Women's FIH Hockey World League Semifinals took place in June and July 2017. A total of 20 teams competed in 2 events in this round of the tournament playing for 7 berths in the Final, to be played between 18–26 November 2017 in Auckland, New Zealand.

This round also served as a qualifier for the 2018 Women's Hockey World Cup as the 10/11 highest placed teams apart from the host nation and the five continental champions qualified.

Qualification
11 teams ranked between 1st and 11th in the FIH World Rankings current at the time of seeking entries for the competition qualified automatically, in addition to 8 teams qualified from Round 2 and one nation that did not meet ranking criteria and was exempt from Round 2 to host a Semifinal. The following twenty teams, shown with final pre-tournament rankings, competed in this round of the tournament.

Brussels

All times are local (UTC+2).

First round

Pool A

Pool B

Second round

Quarterfinals

Ninth and tenth place

Fifth to eighth place classification

Crossover

Seventh and eighth place

Fifth and sixth place

First to fourth place classification

Semifinals

Third and fourth place

Final

Awards

Johannesburg

All times are local (UTC+2).

First round

Pool A

Pool B

Second round

Quarterfinals

Ninth and tenth place

Fifth to eighth place classification

Crossover

Seventh and eighth place

Fifth and sixth place

First to fourth place classification

Semifinals

Third and fourth place

Final

Awards

Final standings
Qualification for 2018 Hockey World Cup

 Host nation
 Continental champions
 Qualified through FIH Hockey World League

Goalscorers

References

External links
Official website (Brussels)
Official website (Johannesburg)

Semifinals
International women's field hockey competitions hosted by South Africa
International women's field hockey competitions hosted by Belgium
FIH Hockey World League Semifinals Women
FIH Hockey World League Semifinals Women
Women's Hockey World Cup qualifiers
Hockey World League Semifinals